Karimabad (also Romanized as Karīmābād) is a village in Horjand Rural District, Kuhsaran District, Ravar County, Kerman Province, Iran. At the 2006 census, its population was 47, in 13 families.

References 

Populated places in Ravar County